For non-building structures like towers, masts and chimneys, see List of tallest structures in France

Tallest buildings

Tallest buildings under construction

Tallest proposed/approved buildings

References